HMS Royal George was a 120-gun first-rate ship of the line of the Royal Navy, launched on 22 September 1827 at Chatham Dockyard.

In 1853 she was fitted with screw propulsion. Boilers and engines were placed in space previously used for water tanks. Further space had to be given over to storing coal, which made the ship rather crowded. In February 1856 Captain Henry Codrington was replaced by Captain Robinson.

On 27 October 1867, Royal George was driven ashore at Kingstown, County Dublin. She was sold out of the service in 1875.

Notes

References

 Lavery, Brian (2003) The Ship of the Line - Volume 1: The development of the battlefleet 1650-1850. Conway Maritime Press. .
 Lyon, David and Winfield, Rif (2004) The Sail and Steam Navy List: All the Ships of the Royal Navy 1815-1889. Chatham Publishing, London. .

External links
 

Ships of the line of the Royal Navy
Caledonia-class ships of the line
Ships built in Chatham
1827 ships
Crimean War naval ships of the United Kingdom
Maritime incidents in October 1867